Henri-François Gautrin (born July 30, 1943 in Béthune, France) is a Quebec politician, professor and physicist. He was the Member of National Assembly of Quebec for the riding of Verdun in the Montreal region. He represented the Quebec Liberal Party and was the former Minister of Governmental Services from February 2006 to February 2007.

Gautrin went to Collège Stanislas before going to the Université de Montréal where he obtained a bachelor's degree in sciences. He later obtained a master's degree in sciences at McGill University before heading to the Université de Dijon in France in 1971 where he received a State doctor's degree. He also studied economics and public finance in Paris.

He was a professor in the mathematics department at the Université de Montréal since 1969. In addition to his teaching duties at that university, he was also an administration staff member and a member of the executive committee.

He was also active in politics as the leader of the New Democratic Party of Quebec from 1973 to 1979 and was the president of the NO committee in the Taillon riding in the 1980 referendum. He was then a candidate for the Liberals in the 1981 elections in the riding of Dorion, where he was defeated.

Gautrin was elected in Verdun in the 1989 elections where he was named the Caucus chair of the MNAs in Western Montreal and was briefly the Parliamentary Secretary to the Minister of Education before the Liberals were defeated by the Parti Québécois. He was re-elected for two other terms as an MNA for the opposition party in 1994 and 1998.

When the Liberals returned to power in 2003, Gautrin was named the Parliamentary secretary to Premier Jean Charest from 2003 to 2005. In 2005, he was named the Online Government Minister and in 2006 the Minister of Governmental Services. After being re-elected in 2007, he was named the Assistant House Leader of the Government and parliamentary assistant to the Premier. He was re-elected in the 2008 Quebec general election.

Electoral record (partial)

External links 
 

1943 births
Living people
French emigrants to Quebec
McGill University alumni
Members of the Executive Council of Quebec
New Democratic Party candidates for the Canadian House of Commons
New Democratic Party of Quebec candidates in Quebec provincial elections
People from Béthune
Quebec candidates for Member of Parliament
Quebec CCF/NDP leaders
Quebec Liberal Party MNAs
Université de Montréal alumni
People from Verdun, Quebec
21st-century Canadian politicians